Khujirt Airport  is an airport in Mongolia. The airport is located in Khujirt, capital of the province of Övörkhangai. It has a grass runway 09/27 .

See also
List of airports in Mongolia

Airports in Mongolia